Zurab Zviadauri (born July 2, 1981) is a Georgian judoka who competed in the Men's 90 kg at the 2004 Summer Olympics and won the gold medal, the first for Georgia. He is a scholarship holder with the Olympic Solidarity program. He also won two silver medals on world championships (in 2001 and in 2003) and a bronze on European championship in 2002.

Zvidauri is also signed to mixed martial arts-promotion World Victory Road, but has yet to make his MMA-debut. In 2012, he was elected to the Parliament of Georgia for the Akhmeta Municipality on a Georgian Dream coalition ticket.

Zviadauri is a cousin of another olympic champion, Georgian-born Greek Judoka Ilias Iliadis (born Jarji Zviadauri), who also won gold at the 2004 Summer Olympic games.

Zvidauri was arrested on August 17th, 2021, in connection with the murder of three people.

References

External links
 

1981 births
Living people
Male judoka from Georgia (country)
Olympic judoka of Georgia (country)
Judoka at the 2004 Summer Olympics
Olympic gold medalists for Georgia (country)
Olympic medalists in judo
Medalists at the 2004 Summer Olympics
Members of the Parliament of Georgia
Recipients of the Presidential Order of Excellence
Georgian Dream politicians